Gaiki  is a village in the administrative district of Gmina Jerzmanowa, within Głogów County, Lower Silesian Voivodeship, in south-western Poland.

The village has an approximate population of 200.

References

Gaiki